Verkhnyadzvinsk District (Belarusian: Верхнядзьвінскі раён, Russian: Верхнедвинский район) is a second-level administrative subdivision (raion) of Belarus in the Vitebsk Region. In this district is the northernmost point of Belarus, situated to the north of Osveya Lake. Osveya Lake is the second largest lake in the country. Another large lake in Verkhnyadzvinsk District is Lisno, which is the twelfth largest in Belarus.

References

 
Districts of Vitebsk Region